Ernst Bøgh (born 13 January 1945) is a Danish former motorcycle speedway rider, who rode in Britain for Leicester Lions and Sheffield Tigers.

Speedway career
Born in Fredericia, Bøgh rode successfully in several countries before signing to ride for Leicester Lions in the British League in 1976, becoming the first Dane to ride for the Lions. After struggling to be competitive he was released after riding in eleven matches. He subsequently signed for Sheffield Tigers, but his tenure there was even shorter.

Family
His brother Kurt Bøgh was also a speedway rider.

References

1945 births
Living people
Danish speedway riders
Leicester Lions riders
Sheffield Tigers riders
People from Fredericia
Sportspeople from the Region of Southern Denmark